Seeing is believing may refer to:

Film and television
 "Seeing is Believing" (Code Lyoko episode)
 UFOs: Seeing is Believing, a UFO documentary film
 Seeing Is Believing: Handicams, Human Rights and the News, a 2002 Canadian documentary film
 Seeing is Believing (film), a 1934 British film

Music
 Seein' Is Believin, a song Guy Lombardo and His Royal Canadians; see 
 Seeing is Believing (album), an album by German singer Xavier Naidoo
 "Seeing is Believing" (song), a song by Andrew Lloyd Webber from Aspects of Love
 "Seein' Is Believing", a 1997 song by Adriana Evans

Other uses
 Seeing is Believing (novel), a 1941 mystery novel by John Dickson Carr writing as "Carter Dickson"
 Seeing is Believing (organization), a partnership for the prevention of avoidable blindness
 Seeing Is Believing Tour, magician Dynamo's 2015-16 live tour